Bobby or Bobbie may refer to:

People
 Bobby (given name), a list of names
 Bobby (surname), a list of surnames
 Bobby (actress), from Bangladesh
 Bobby (rapper) (born 1995), from South Korea
 Bobby (screenwriter) (born 1983), Indian screenwriter
 Bobby, old slang for a constable in British law enforcement
 Bobby, disused British railway term for a signalman

Events
 Kidnapping of Bobby Greenlease, a 1953 crime in Kansas City, Missouri
 Murder of Bobby Äikiä, Swedish boy who was tortured and killed by his mother and stepfather in 2006

Dogs
 Greyfriars Bobby (1855–1???), legendary 19th century Scottish dog
 Bobbie (dog), a British regimental dog who survived the Battle of Maiwand
 Bobbie the Wonder Dog, an American dog that walked 2,551 miles to find its owners

Films
 Bobby (1973 film), an Indian Bollywood film
 Bobby (2002 film), an Indian Telugu film
 Bobby (2006 film), a film about the day Robert F. Kennedy was assassinated

Music
 BOBBY (band), an American indie-folk-psychedelic music group
 Bobby  (Bobby album), their eponymous debut album
 Bobby (Bobby Brown album), 1992
 Bobby (When People Were Shorter and Lived Near the Water album), 1989
 Bobby, soundtrack album to the 2006 film
 "Bobby", a 1957 song by Barbara McNair
 "Bobby", a 1961 song by Ricky Valance
 "Bobby", a 2013 song by GFOTY
 Golden Bobby, an award given by the Verband Deutscher Tonmeister

Other uses
 Bobby (software), used to validate websites

See also
 Bobby pin
 Bobby sock
 Bobbi, a list of people with the given name
 Booby
 Matteo Bobbi (born 1978), Italian race car driver
 Walter Bobbie (born 1945), American theatre director and choreographer